Bianca Spender (born 18 November 1977) is an Australian fashion designer.

Early life 
Spender was born in 1976 to Italian Australian fashion designer Carla Zampatti and former Liberal politician John Spender QC. Spender has a sister, Allegra Spender, and a half brother Alexander Schuman.

About her family, she stated "I grew up in the shadow of a larger-than-life mother, who was passionate about her success, and passionate about teaching her children to understand the value of money, hard work, and independence. My father, on the other hand, was an intellectual, a diplomat and a quiet, considerate thinker from a privileged family."

Career 
Spender started her fashion career designing in her mother’s studio from age 12. Spender earned a Bachelor of Commerce at the East Sydney Fashion Design School and then travelled to Italy and Paris to immerse herself in pattern making and design. Spender eventually joined the Carla Zampatti brand and launching Bianca Spender for Carla Zampatti. In 2017 Spender branched out with her own namesake label, 'Bianca Spender', which was initially stocked through David Jones stores.

Personal life 
Spender lives in Sydney with husband Sam McGuinness whom she met in 2005 at a gig. The couple have two sons, Dominic and Florian. Spender is interested in healthy living and is a vegetarian.
She also has two siblings; Allegra Spender (Member for Wentworth) and half-brother Alexander Schuman.

References 

1977 births
Living people
Australian fashion designers
Australian women fashion designers
Australian people of Italian descent